= Alma Youlin =

American singer

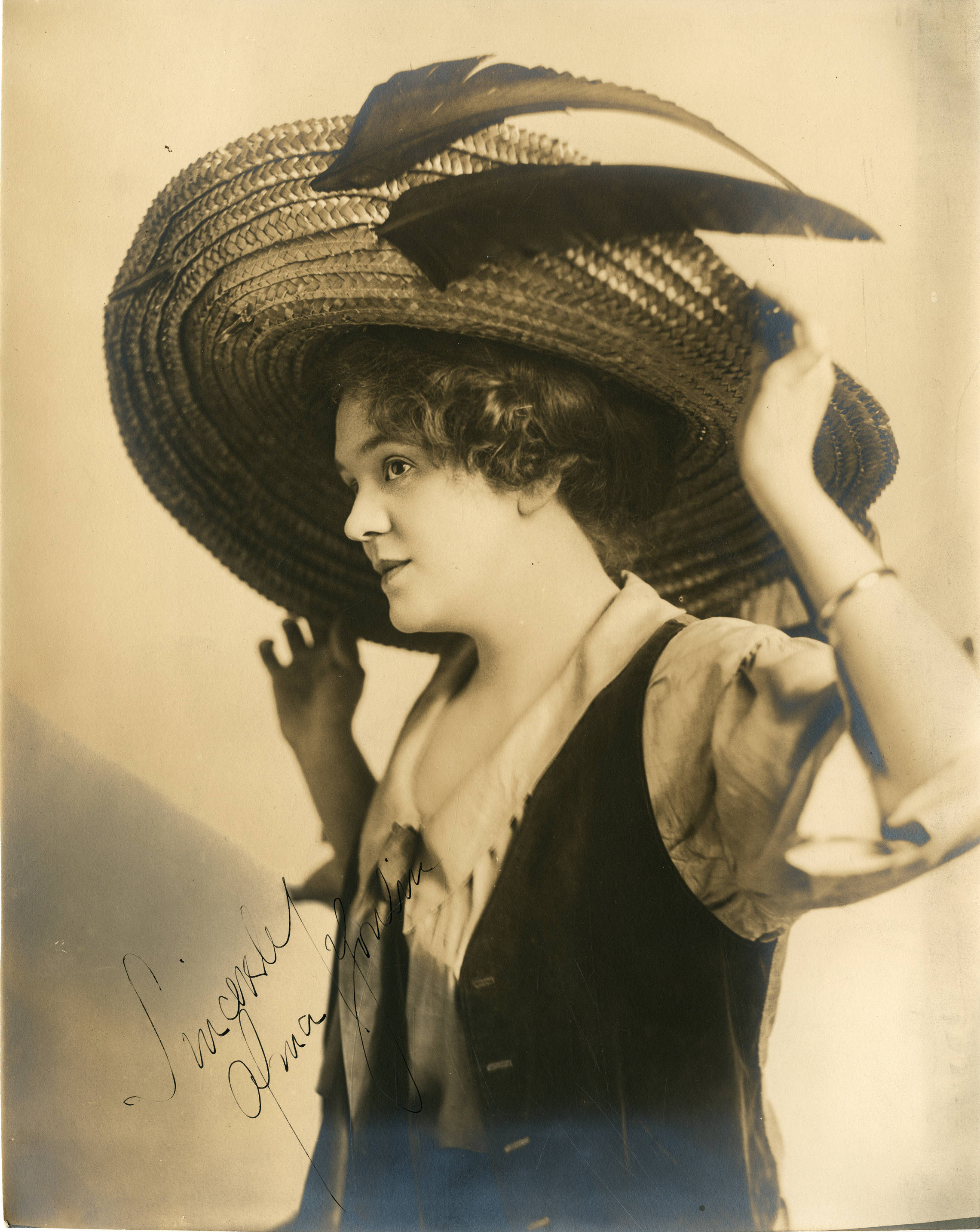
- portrait from c.1911
- Born: Alma Cole Youlin; 1881
- Died: 1949 (aged 67–68)
- Resting place: Sunset Memorial Park, Albuquerque, New Mexico (Bernalillo County, New Mexico)
- Occupation: singer

Alma Youlin (1881-1949) was an American stage singer and actress in the 1900s-1920s. In the 1930s, her career long over, she was living with relatives in Chicago according to the 1940 census.
